North Vista Secondary School is a co-educational government secondary school in Sengkang, Singapore. Founded in 1956 as Gan Eng Seng Government Chinese Middle School, North Vista had a rich heritage to providing all with a holistic education.

History

Thomson Government Chinese Middle School 
North Vista Secondary School was founded as Gan Eng Seng Government Chinese Middle School in 1956, as one of the Government Chinese Middle Schools set up to cater to Chinese school students who had their studies disrupted by the Chinese middle schools riots. The school was renamed as Thomson Government Chinese Middle School, and subsequently as Thomson Secondary School with a merger with Thomson Vocational School in 1958.

Renamed North Vista Secondary School 
On 15 December 2000, the campus was relocated to Sengkang at 11 Rivervale Link, Singapore 545081. With the relocation, Thomson Secondary School was renamed as North Vista Secondary School, while retaining the native name De Xin (德新), as a reflection of its rich heritage, as well as its mission to instil and inspire cultured and innovative youths of the society.

50th Anniversary 
North Vista Secondary School celebrated its 50th anniversary with a gala dinner held on 8 September 2006, with Defence Minister Teo Chee Hean as the guest-of-honour.

References

External links
 Official website
 MOE School Information Service

Schools in Sengkang
Sengkang
Educational institutions established in 1956
1956 establishments in Malaya